Lake Piasa is an unincorporated community in Jersey County, Illinois, United States. It is located west of Brighton and about five miles north of Godfrey.

References

Unincorporated communities in Illinois
Unincorporated communities in Jersey County, Illinois